Dayang Nurfaizah binti Awang Dowty (born 20 July 1981) is a Malaysian singer. Her debut self-titled album was released in May 1999 and it was recorded in the pop and R&B genres. The album's lead single, Hakikat Cinta introduced her to the local music industry.

During her fifth year in the Malaysian music industry, Nurfaizah set up her own recording company, DN & AD Entertainment Sdn Bhd. Under that label, on 31 October 2004 she released her fourth studio album, Dayang Sayang Kamu, which was received with rave reviews from the Malaysian public as well as neighboring countries.

In 2006, she participated in One in a Million, a singing competition hosted by Malaysian local television station 8TV. She ended up as one of the four finalists in the competition but was voted out by the Malaysian public on 15 September 2006, as the competition was determined by a 50% text message voting system.

One in a Million

Throughout the competition, Dayang sang:

One Last Cry – Brian McKnight (Top 20)
Aku Cinta Padamu – Sheila Majid (Top 12)
Survivor – Destiny's Child (Top 10)
Crazy in Love – Beyoncé Knowles (Top 9)
Selamanya – Innuendo (Top 8)
Because You Loved Me – Celine Dion (Top 7)
Fever – Peggy Lee (Top 6)
Be Without You – Mary J. Blige (Top 6)
Gemilang – Jaclyn Victor (Top 5)
Dangerously in Love – Beyoncé Knowles (Top 5)
Buttons – Pussycat Dolls (Top 4)
My Boo – Usher feat. Alicia Keys (duet with VE) (Top 4)

Discography

Albums
 Dayang Nurfaizah (7 May 1999)
 Seandainya Masih Ada Cinta (8 February 2001)
 Di Sini Bermula, re-released of her Debut album (3 February 2002)
 Hembusan Asmara (28 November 2002)
 Dayang Sayang Kamu (2004)
 Dayang Sayang Kamu (Repackaged) (2005)
 Kasih (28 November 2005)
 Buat Kamu, repackaged of Hembusan Asmara (2006)
 Dayang 20 07 (21 July 2007)
 Sayang & Cahaya (1 May 2011)
 Dayang Nurfaizah (7 April 2017)

Live albums
 Dayang Live (2009) (Live at Planet Hollywood in July 2008)
 Anuar & Dayang (2013) (Live at Petronas Philharmonic Hall)

Compilation albums
 Jelita Hebat (September 1999)
 Duet Gempak (2002)
 Ini Baru Gempaq (2002)
 Suara Hati pop R&B (2002)
 Nafas Baru (2003)
 The Best of Dayang Nurfaizah (24 September 2003)
 Best of The Best Anuar & Dayang (2004)
 Pujaan Pop Duet (2005)
 Tiada Lama, Tiada Baharu (2010)

Single
 Hakikat Cinta (1999)
 Seandainya Masih Ada Cinta (2001)
 Need A Break (2004)
 Luka (including in the Novel namely 'Luka') (12 March 2009)
 Ku Temu Cahaya (2010)
 Dayang & Marcell (2010)
 Perlukan Cinta (Featuring Tompi) (2011)
 Bisikan Rinduku (OST Drama "Dahlia")
 Di Pintu Syurga (OST Drama "Ariana Rose")
 Langit Cinta (OST Filem Langit Cinta)
 Tak Pernah Menyerah (2015 - OST Dawai Asmara)
 Lelaki Teragung (2016 - OST 7 Hari Mencintaiku)
 Separuh Mati Ku Bercinta (2017 - OST Pinggan Tak Retak Nasi Tak Dingin)
 Haram (2018 - Hael Husaini ft Dayang Nurfaizah)
 Sebentar (2019)

VCD/MTV Karaoke
 Hits MTV Karaoke Koleksi Dengan Vocal Original (2002)
 Dayang MTV Karaoke (2006)
 Dayang Ingin Ku Miliki MTV Karaoke (2008)

Greatest Hit Songs
 Hakikat Cinta
 Kembalilah Sayang
 Rindu
 Pusaka Rimba (Duet with Ziana Zain)
 Seandainya Masih Ada Cinta
 Sekali Lagi
 Sedingin Mana Cintamu
 Di Sini Bermula
 Hujan Lagi Hati Ini
 Rindu Bayangan (Duet with Dino, Dayang's Brother)
 Pintaku Yang Terakhir
 Hembusan Asmara
 Mana Mungkin
 Dayang Sayang Kamu
 Melerai Prasangka
 Erti Hidup
 Kasih Maafkan
 Kasih
 Saat Yang Bahagia
 Ingin Ku Miliki
 Hilang
 Luka
 Sayang (Duet With Marcell)
 Ku Temu Cahaya
 Perlukan Cinta (Featuring Tompi)
 Bisikan Rinduku (OST Drama "Dahlia")
 Di Pintu Syurga (OST Drama "Ariana Rose")
 Tak Pernah Menyerah
 Langit Cinta (OST Film "Langit Cinta")
 Lelaki Teragung (New Single/ Winner AJL31)
 Haram (ft. Hael Husaini - New Single/Winner AJL 33)

Other Songs
 Selamat Hari Raya (2002)
 Kepulangan Yang Dinanti (2002)
 Taurus (Penawar Rindu) by Imran Ajmain (Featuring Altimet & Dayang Nurfaizah) (2007)
 Losing Me (12 March 2009)
 Lately (Global One Music) (4 May 2009)
 Tanpamu (Feat. Daly Ahli Fiqir)(Global One Music) (4 May 2009)
 Pulang (2009)
 Lil' Secret By Liang (Featuring Dayang Nurfaizah) (2009)
 Syukur Selalu (feat. Black Hanifah - 2015)

Awards, accolades and achievements

Anugerah Industri Muzik

Anugerah Juara Lagu

1996
 Golden Teen Search 1996 Finalist (Radio Televisyen Malaysia)
 Bintang Remaja 1996 Finalist (Kuching, Sarawak)
 Bintang Remaja Asli 1996 Champion (Kuching, Sarawak)

1997
 Bintang Remaja 1997 Champion (Kuching, Sarawak)
 Golden Teen Search 1997 Champion (Radio Televisyen Malaysia)

2001
 Winner of Bintang Penghibur HMI, 2001
 Best Fashion Bintang penghibur HMI 2001
 Most Popular Song (Seandainya Masih Ada Cinta) APM 2001
 Top 5 Finalist for Most Popular Female Singer ABP 2001
 Top 5 Finalist for Choice of Pop Song (Seandainya Masih Ada Cinta) ERA Award 2001

2002
 Winner of Konsert Hitz Pilihan Pendengar RMKL 2002
 1st Runner-up for Best Performance Konsert Hitz Pilihan Pendengar RMKL 2002

2005
 Top 5 Finalist for Choice of Female Vocal ERA Award 2005
 Top 5 Finalist for Choice of Pop Song (Dayang Sayang Kamu) ERA Award 2005
 Winner of Choice of Ethnic Song (Erti Hidup)ERA Award 2005
 Finalist at HITZ1 2005 (Dayang Sayang Kamu)
 Top 5 Finalist for Most Popular Female Singer ABP 2005

2006
 Top 5 Finalist for Choice of Pop Song (Kasih) ERA Award 2006
 Top 5 Finalist for Choice of Music Video (Kasih Maafkan) ERA Award 2006
 Top 5 Finalist for Choice of Female Vocal ERA Award 2006
 Top 5 Finalist for Best Album (Dayang Sayang Kamu) APM 2006
 Top 5 Finalist for Best Female Vocal APM 2006

2008
 Top 5 Finalist for Best Female Artist – APM 2008

2017
Artis Wanita Terbaik Anugerah Planet Muzik 2017
 Lagu Terbaik (Malaysia) - Lelaki Teragung Anugerah Planet Muzik 2017

References

External links
All Dayang Nurfaizah's News
Dayang's One In A Million profile

1981 births
Living people
Malaysian people of Malay descent
Malaysian women pop singers
Malaysian Muslims
Malaysian television personalities
One in a Million (Malaysian TV series) participants
People from Kuching
People from Sarawak
Malay-language singers
Malaysian rhythm and blues singers
Malaysian hip hop singers
21st-century Malaysian women singers
Women hip hop musicians